Carolyn Penstein Rosé is an American computer scientist who is a Professor of Language Technologies at Carnegie Mellon University. Her research looks to understand human conversation, and use this understanding to build computer systems that support effective communication in an effort to improve human learning. She has previously served as President of the International Society for the Learning Sciences and a Leshner Fellow of the American Association for the Advancement of Science.

Early life and education 

Rosé studied computer science at the University of California, Irvine. She moved to the Carnegie Mellon University for her graduate studies, first completing a master's degree in computational linguistics and then her doctorate in language technologies. Rosé worked under the supervision of Lori Levin. After completing her doctorate, Rosé was appointed to the faculty at the University of Pittsburgh.

Research and career 
Rosé returned to Carnegie Mellon University in 2003, where she was awarded tenure in 2014 and made Professor in 2017. Rosé believes that for computer systems to be as useful and efficient as possible, they must be capable of making meaning from conversation. Rosé studies the mechanics of human conversation and uses the findings to computer-supported learning interventions. These programs were shown to improve educational outcomes. At Carnegie Mellon, Rosé directs the Discussion Affordances for Natural Collaborative Exchange (DANCE) programme.

Rosé served as president of the International Society of the Learning Sciences in 2015. In 2020 Rosé was awarded an American Association for the Advancement of Science Leshner Leadership Fellowship. The 2020 fellowships supported public engagement in artificial intelligence.

Selected publications

References 

Women computer scientists
Carnegie Mellon University faculty
Fellows of the American Association for the Advancement of Science
University of California, Irvine alumni
Carnegie Mellon University alumni
University of Pittsburgh faculty
Year of birth missing (living people)
Living people